The R485 road is a regional road in Ireland which links the Kilmurry McMahon with the N68 road in County Clare.

See also 

 Roads in Ireland
 National primary road
 National secondary road

References 

Regional roads in the Republic of Ireland

Roads in County Clare